Line Dissing Karred Larsen (born 1 November 1996, in Skagen) known as Line (pronounced lee-neh in Danish), is a Danish singer. She took part in season 5 of the Danish X Factor and became one of the finalists in the "Under 25" category, mentored by Pernille Rosendahl. On the final held on 23 March 2012, she finished as the runner-up, with 38.3% of the public vote, behind Ida, who carried the title with 61.7%. She was signed to Sony Music, and her debut single "Efter dig" reached No. 3 in the Danish Singles Chart.

Performances during X Factor

After X Factor
Immediately after the win, Line released her winning song as her debut single appearing which reached straight to No. 3 in its week of release.

Discography

Singles

References

1996 births
21st-century Danish women singers
X Factor (Danish TV series) contestants
People from Skagen
Living people
Sony BMG artists